Paul Joseph Schrader (born July 22, 1946) is an American screenwriter, film director, and film critic. He first received widespread recognition through his screenplay for Martin Scorsese's Taxi Driver (1976). He later continued his collaboration with Scorsese, writing or co-writing Raging Bull (1980), The Last Temptation of Christ (1988), and Bringing Out the Dead (1999). Schrader has also directed 24 films, including Blue Collar (1978), Hardcore (1979), American Gigolo (1980), Cat People (1982), Mishima: A Life in Four Chapters (1985), Light Sleeper (1992), Affliction (1997), and First Reformed (2017); the latter earned him his first Academy Award nomination. Schrader's work is known for its frequent depiction of alienated men struggling through existential crises, a premise known as "God’s lonely man."

Raised in a strict Calvinist family, Schrader attended Calvin College before electing to pursue film studies at UCLA on the encouragement of film critic Pauline Kael. He then worked as a film scholar and critic, publishing the  book Transcendental Style in Film: Ozu, Bresson, Dreyer (1972) before making the transition to screenwriting in 1974. The success of Taxi Driver in 1976 brought greater attention to his work, and Schrader began directing his own films beginning with  Blue Collar (co-written with his brother, Leonard Schrader). His three most recent films have been described by Schrader as a loose trilogy: First Reformed (2017), The Card Counter (2021), and Master Gardener (2022).

Early life and education
Schrader was born in Grand Rapids, Michigan, the son of Joan (née Fisher) and Charles A. Schrader, an executive. Schrader's family attended the Calvinist Christian Reformed Church. Schrader's mother was of Dutch descent, the daughter of emigrants from Friesland, while Schrader's paternal grandfather was from a German family that had come to the U.S. through Canada.

His early life was based upon the religion's strict principles and parental education. He did not see a film until he was seventeen years old, when he was able to sneak away from home. In an interview he stated that The Absent-Minded Professor was the first film he saw. In his own words, he was "very unimpressed" by it, while Wild in the Country, which he saw some time later, had quite some effect on him. Schrader attributes his intellectual rather than emotional approach towards movies and movie-making to his having no adolescent movie memories.

Schrader earned his B.A. in philosophy with a minor in theology from Calvin College, but decided against becoming a minister. He then earned an M.A. in film studies at the UCLA Film School upon the recommendation of Pauline Kael, who encouraged him to be a film critic.

Schrader first became a film critic, writing for the Los Angeles Free Press and later for Cinema magazine. His book Transcendental Style in Film: Ozu, Bresson, Dreyer, which examines the similarities between Robert Bresson, Yasujirō Ozu, and Carl Theodor Dreyer, was published in 1972. Other film-makers who made a lasting impression on Schrader are John Ford, Jean Renoir, Roberto Rossellini, Alfred Hitchcock, and Sam Peckinpah. Renoir's The Rules of the Game he called the "quintessential movie" which represents "all of the cinema".

Film career
In 1974, Schrader and his brother Leonard co-wrote The Yakuza, a film set in the Japanese crime world. The script became the subject of a bidding war, eventually selling for $325,000. The film was directed by Sydney Pollack and starred Robert Mitchum. Robert Towne, best known for Chinatown, also received a credit for his rewrite.

Although The Yakuza failed commercially, it brought Schrader to the attention of the new generation of Hollywood directors. In 1975, he wrote the script for Obsession for Brian De Palma. Schrader wrote an early draft of Steven Spielberg's Close Encounters of the Third Kind (1977), but Spielberg disliked the script, calling it "terribly guilt-ridden," and opted for something lighter. He also wrote an early draft of Rolling Thunder (1977), which the film's producers had reworked without his participation. He disapproved of the final film.

Schrader's script about an obsessed New York City taxi driver became Martin Scorsese's film Taxi Driver, which was nominated for the Oscar for Best Picture and won the Palme d'Or at the Cannes Film Festival. Besides Taxi Driver (1976), Scorsese also drew on scripts by Schrader for the boxing tale Raging Bull (1980), co-written with Mardik Martin, The Last Temptation of Christ (1988), and Bringing Out the Dead (1999).

Thanks partly to critical acclaim for Taxi Driver, Schrader was able to direct his first feature, Blue Collar (1978), co-written with his brother Leonard. Blue Collar features Richard Pryor, Harvey Keitel, and Yaphet Kotto as car factory workers attempting to escape their socio-economic rut through theft and blackmail. He has described the film as difficult to make, because of the artistic and personal tensions between him and the cast. During principal photography he suffered an on-set mental collapse which led him to seriously reconsider his career. John Milius acted as executive producer on the following year's Hardcore, again written by Schrader, a film with many autobiographical parallels in his depiction of the Calvinist milieu of Grand Rapids, and in the character of George C. Scott, which was based on Schrader's father.

Among Paul Schrader's films in the 1980s were American Gigolo starring Richard Gere (1980), his Cat People (1982) a remake of the 1942 film Cat People, and Mishima: A Life in Four Chapters (1985). Inspired by Japanese writer Yukio Mishima, the film interweaves episodes from Mishima's life with dramatizations of segments from his books. Mishima was nominated for the top prize (the Palme d'Or) at the Cannes Film Festival. Francis Ford Coppola and George Lucas served as executive producers.

Schrader also directed Patty Hearst (1988), about the kidnapping and transformation of the Hearst Corporation heiress. In 1987, he was a member of the jury at the 37th Berlin International Film Festival.

His 1990s work included the travelers-in-Venice tale The Comfort of Strangers (1990), adapted by Harold Pinter from the Ian McEwan novel, and Light Sleeper (1992), a sympathetic study of a drug dealer vying for a normal life. In 2005 Schrader described Light Sleeper as his "most personal" film. In 1997 he made Touch (1997), based on an Elmore Leonard novel about a young man seemingly able to cure the sick by the laying on of hands.

In 1998, Schrader won critical acclaim for the drama Affliction. The film tells the story of a troubled small town policeman (Nick Nolte) who becomes obsessed with solving the mystery behind a fatal hunting accident. Schrader's script was based on the novel by Russell Banks. The film was nominated for multiple awards including two Academy Awards for acting (for Nolte and James Coburn). The same year, Schrader received the Austin Film Festival's Distinguished Screenwriter Award.

In 1999, Schrader received the Laurel Award for Screenwriting Achievement from the Writers Guild of America.

In 2002, he directed the acclaimed biopic Auto Focus, based on the life and murder of Hogan's Heroes actor Bob Crane.

In 2003, Schrader made entertainment headlines after being fired from The Exorcist: Dominion, a prequel film to the horror classic The Exorcist from 1973. The film's production companies Morgan Creek Productions and Warner Bros. Pictures greatly disliked the film Schrader had made. Director Renny Harlin was hired to then re-shoot nearly the entire film, which was released as Exorcist: The Beginning on August 20, 2004, to disastrously negative reviews and embarrassing box office receipts. Warner Bros. and Morgan Creek put over $80 million into the endeavor and Harlin's film only made back $41 million domestically. Schrader's version of the film eventually premiered at the Brussels International Festival of Fantastic Film on March 18, 2005, as Exorcist: The Original Prequel. Due to extreme interest in Schrader's version from critics and cinephiles alike, Warner Bros. agreed to give the film a limited theatrical release later that year under the title Dominion: Prequel to the Exorcist. The film was only shown on 110 screens around the United States and made just $251,000. The critics liked Schrader's version much better than Harlin's. However, Schrader's film ultimately met with a generally negative reaction.

After that, Schrader filmed The Walker (2007), starring Woody Harrelson as a male escort caught up in a political murder enquiry, and the Israeli-set Adam Resurrected (2008), which stars Jeff Goldblum and Willem Dafoe.

Schrader headed the International Jury of the 2007 Berlin International Film Festival, and in 2011 became a jury member for the ongoing Filmaka short film contest. On July 2, 2009, Schrader was awarded the inaugural Lifetime Achievement in Screenwriting award at the ScreenLit Festival in Nottingham, England. Several of his films were shown at the festival, including Mishima: A Life in Four Chapters, which followed the presentation of the award by director Shane Meadows.

After five years of trying and failing to find funding to make feature films, Schrader returned with The Canyons (2013) an erotic dramatic thriller written by Bret Easton Ellis and starring Lindsay Lohan and adult-film star James Deen. The film gained notability as it was one of the first films to use the website Kickstarter to crowd-source its funding. Schrader also used the website Let It Cast to have unknown actors submit their audition tapes over the internet. American Apparel stepped in to provide some wardrobe for the film. The film gained media coverage due to Lohan's notorious on-set behavior, as well as the film's unusual production route. The film was ultimately made for just $250,000 and had a limited theatrical release from IFC Films on August 2, 2013. The film was poorly received by general critics and audiences. The film only made $56,000 in theaters but found later success when released on various Video on Demand platforms.

In 2014, Schrader directed The Dying of the Light, an espionage thriller starring Nicolas Cage as a government agent suffering from a deadly disease, Anton Yelchin and Irène Jacob. In post-production Schrader was denied final cut by the film's producers. The film was negatively received by many film critics and was a box-office bomb. Schrader later recut Dying of the Light into the separate, more experimental work Dark, which received more positive reviews.

Schrader's dramatic thriller First Reformed, starring Ethan Hawke, premiered at the 2017 Venice Film Festival and received critical acclaim. Schrader received his first Academy Award nomination for the film in the category Best Original Screenplay.

In 2021, Schrader directed the crime drama film The Card Counter, starring Oscar Isaac and Tiffany Haddish. The film also premiered at the 2021 Venice Film Festival and was widely lauded by critics.

Schrader's new film, Master Gardener, is a crime thriller starring Joel Edgerton and Sigourney Weaver. It is set to premier at the 2022 Venice Film Festival.

Theatre career
Schrader has written two stage plays, Berlinale and Cleopatra Club. The latter saw its premiere at the Powerhouse Theater in Poughkeepsie, New York, in 1995 and its foreign language debut in Vienna in 2011.

Themes
A recurring theme in Schrader's films is the protagonist on a self-destructive path, or undertaking actions which work against himself, deliberately or subconsciously. The finale often bears an element of redemption, preceded by a painful sacrifice or cathartic act of violence.

Schrader has repeatedly referred to Taxi Driver, American Gigolo, Light Sleeper, The Canyons, The Walker, First Reformed, and The Card Counter as "a man in a room" stories. The protagonist in each film changes from an angry, then narcissistic, later anxious character, to a person who hides behind a mask of superficiality.

Although many of his films or scripts are based on real-life biographies (Raging Bull, Mishima: A Life in Four Chapters, Patty Hearst, Auto Focus), Schrader confessed having problems with biographical films due to their altering of actual events, which he tried to prevent by imposing structures and stylization.

Personal life
Schrader battled a severe cocaine addiction, which contributed to his divorce from his first wife, art director Jeannine Oppewall. He then moved from Los Angeles to Japan in hopes of getting his life on track, finally quitting drugs around 1990.  His second marriage is to actress Mary Beth Hurt, who has appeared in smaller roles in a variety of his films. Together they have two children, a daughter and a son.
In 2012, Schrader participated in the Sight & Sound film polls of that year. Held every ten years to select the greatest films of all time, contemporary directors were asked to select ten films of their choice. Schrader gave the following ten in alphabetical order.

 Citizen Kane (1941)
 The Conformist (1970)
 In the Mood for Love (2000)
 The Lady Eve (1941)
 Orpheus (1950)
 Pickpocket (1959)
 The Rules of the Game (1939)
 Tokyo Story (1953)
 Vertigo (1958)
 The Wild Bunch (1969)

In September 2022, Schrader was hospitalized for COVID-19 and pneumonia which had resulted in "breathing difficulties".

Religion
Schrader was raised as a Calvinist but became an Episcopalian after the birth of his children. As of 2018, he attends a Presbyterian church. His films frequently feature religious themes.

Filmography

Films

Music video

Documentary feature film appearances
 2018 – What She Said: The Art of Pauline Kael
 2015 – Hitchcock/Truffaut
 2013 – Richard Pryor: Omit the Logic
 2013 – Milius
 2011 – Eames: The Architect & The Painter
 2011 – These Amazing Shadows
 2009 – Tales from the Script
 2008 – Erika Rabau: Puck of Berlin
 2003 – Easy Riders, Raging Bulls: How the Sex, Drugs and Rock 'N' Roll Generation Saved Hollywood
 2003 – A Decade Under the Influence

Theatre

Awards

Won
 1976 – National Board of Review, USA, NBR Award – Top 10 Films of the Year for Obsession
 1977 – National Society of Film Critics Awards, USA, 2nd Place, NSFC Award – Best Film for Taxi Driver
 1980 – Los Angeles Film Critics Association Awards, LAFCA Award – Best Picture for Raging Bull
 1980 – National Board of Review, USA, NBR Award – Top 10 Films of the Year for Raging Bull
 1980 – New York Film Critics Circle Awards, 3rd Place, NYFCC Award – Best Film for Raging Bull
 1981 – National Society of Film Critics Awards, USA, 2nd Place, NSFC Award – Best Film for Raging Bull (tied with Every Man for Himself)
 1981 – Boston Society of Film Critics Awards, BSFC Award – Best Film for Raging Bull
 1985 – Cannes Film Festival, Best Artistic Film for Mishima a life in four chapters
 1990 – National Film Preservation Board, USA, National Film Registry for Raging Bull
 1993 – New York Film Critics Circle Awards, 3rd place NYFCC Award – Best Film for Light Sleeper
 1994 – National Film Preservation Board, USA, National Film Registry for Taxi Driver
 1997 – Valladolid International Film Festival, Youth Jury Award – Special Mention for Affliction
 1998 – Taos Talking Picture Festival, Storyteller Award
 1998 – New York Film Critics Circle Awards, 2nd Place, NYFCC Award – Best Film for Affliction
 1999 – National Society of Film Critics Awards, USA, 2nd Place, NSFC Award – Best Film for Affliction
 1999 – Golden Trailer Awards, Golden Trailer – Best in Show for Bringing Out the Dead
 1999 – Writers Guild of America, USA, Laurel Award for Screen Writing Achievement
 2005 – American Film Institute, USA, Franklin J. Schaffner Award
 2007 – Stockholm International Film Festival, Lifetime Achievement Award
 2008 – St. Louis International Film Festival, Lifetime Achievement Award
 2009 – Cinemanila International Film Festival, Lifetime Achievement Award
 2013 – Melbourne Underground Film Festival, Best Foreign Director for The Canyons
 2013 – Melbourne Underground Film Festival, Best Foreign Film for The Canyons
 2013 – Ghent International Film Festival, Joseph Plateau Honorary Award
 2013 – Valladolid International Film Festival, Honorary Spike for The Canyons
 2018 – Gotham Independent Film Award, Best Screenplay for First Reformed
 2018 – National Board of Review, Best Original Screenplay for First Reformed
 2018 – New York Film Critics Circle, Best Screenplay for First Reformed
 2021 – Zurich Film Festival, Lifetime Achievement Award
 2022 – Venice Film Festival, Golden Lion Honorary Award

Nominated
 1977 – Golden Globes, USA, Golden Globe – Best Screenplay – Motion Picture for Taxi Driver
 1977 – Writers Guild of America, USA, WGA Award (Screen) for Taxi Driver
 1977 – Academy of Science Fiction, Fantasy & Horror Films, USA, Golden Scroll – Best Horror Film for Obsession
 1979 – Berlin International Film Festival, Golden Berlin Bear for Hardcore
 1981 – Golden Globes, USA, Golden Globe – Best Screenplay – Motion Picture for Raging Bull (shared with Mardik Martin)
 1985 – Cannes Film Festival, Palme d'Or for Mishima: A Life in Four Chapters
 1988 – Cannes Film Festival, Palme d'Or for Patty Hearst
 1988 – National Board of Review, USA, NBR Award – Top 10 Films of the Year for The Last Temptation of Christ
 1989 – Political Film Society, USA, PFS Award – Exposé for Patty Hearst
 1992 – Berlin International Film Festival, Golden Berlin Bear for Light Sleeper
 1992 – Deauville Film Festival, Critics Award for Light Sleeper
 1993 – Independent Spirit Awards – Best Screenplay for Light Sleeper
 1993 – Mystfest, Best Film for Light Sleeper
 1995 – Academy of Science Fiction, Fantasy & Horror Films, USA, Saturn Award – Best Single Genre Television Presentation for Witch Hunt
 1997 – Sitges - Catalan International Film Festival, Best Film for Touch
 1997 – Valladolid International Film Festival, Golden Spike for Affliction
 1998 – Independent Spirit Awards – Best Screenplay for Touch
 1998 – Independent Spirit Awards – Best Director for Touch
 1999 – Independent Spirit Awards – Best Screenplay for Affliction
 1999 – Independent Spirit Awards – Best Director for Affliction
 2002 – San Sebastián International Film Festival, Golden Seashell for Auto Focus
 2003 – Golden Trailer Awards, Golden Trailer – Trashiest Trailer for Auto Focus
 2005 – Golden Raspberry Awards, Razzie Award – Worst Director for Dominion: Prequel to The Exorcist
2018 – Independent Spirit Awards – Best Screenplay for First Reformed
 2018 – Independent Spirit Awards – Best Director for First Reformed
 2019 – Academy Awards – Best Original Screenplay for First Reformed

References

Further reading
 Transcendental Style in Film: Ozu, Bresson, Dreyer, Da Capo Press, 1988.
 Notes on Film Noir, Film Comment, Vol. 8, No. 1, Spring 1972.

External links

 
 
 Interview with Schrader from 1998 on 'Bringing Out the Dead' and his writing techniques by Mikael Colville-Andersen.

1946 births
American film critics
American male non-fiction writers
American male screenwriters
American people of Canadian descent
American people of Dutch descent
American people of German descent
AFI Conservatory alumni
Calvin University alumni
Christians from Michigan 
English-language film directors
Film directors from Michigan
German-language film directors
Living people
Screenwriters from Michigan
University of California, Los Angeles alumni
Writers from Grand Rapids, Michigan